Bennet Bronson Murdock Jr. (October 18, 1925 – March 26, 2022) was an American psychologist known for his research on human memory, especially his pioneering research into short-term memory.

Education
Murdock received his undergraduate degree and Ph.D. from Yale University, receiving the latter degree in 1951. While at Yale, he had contact with Clark L. Hull.

Career
In 1965, Murdock joined the faculty of the University of Toronto, where he remained until he retired in 1991.

Personal life and death
Murdock died in Toronto on March 26, 2022, at the age of 96.

References

External links
Faculty page at the University of Toronto

1925 births
2022 deaths
American expatriates in Canada
21st-century American psychologists
Memory researchers
Academic staff of the University of Toronto
Yale University alumni
People from New Haven, Connecticut